The Ministry of Religious Affairs and Public Education was a  Polish ministry that existed in the years 1918-1939. Following World War II, it was superseded by the Ministry of National Education.

Ministers
1917–1918. Antoni Ponikowski 
1918–1919. Ksawery Prauss.
1919. Jan Łukasiewicz 
1919–1920. Tadeusz Łopuszański.
1920–1921. Maciej Rataj.
1921–1922. Antoni Ponikowski.
1922. Julian Nowak.
1922. Kazimierz Władysław Kumaniecki.
1922–1923. Józef Mikułowski-Pomorski.
1923. Stanisław Głąbiński.
1923. Stanisław Grabski
1923–1924. Bolesław Miklaszewski.
1924–1925. Jan Zawidzki 
1925–1926. Stanisław Grabski.
1926. Józef Mikułowski-Pomorski.
1926. Antoni Sujkowski.
1926–1927. Kazimierz Bartel.
1927–1928. Gustaw Dobrucki.
1928–1929. Kazimierz Świtalski.
1929–1931. Sławomir Czerwiński.
1931–1934. Janusz Jędrzejewicz.
1934–1935. Wacław Jędrzejewicz.
1935. Konstanty Chyliński 
1935–1939. Wojciech Alojzy Świętosławski.

References
EWA KULA, MARZENA PĘKOWSKA, DZIAŁALNOŚĆ MINISTERSTWA WYZNAŃ RELIGIJNYCH I OŚWIECENIA PUBLICZNEGO W DWUDZIESTOLECIU MIĘDZYWOJENNYM NA RZECZ MIĘDZYNARODOWEJ WSPÓŁPRACY INTELEKTUALNEJ

References

External links

1918 establishments in Poland
1939 disestablishments in Poland
Education ministries
Government ministries of Poland
Ministries established in 1918
Former ministries